The Labrador Hollow Unique Area is a  conservation area located in Cortland and Onondaga counties, New York, and was the first property to be designated as a Unique Area by New York. The area is located adjacent to and between Kettlebail State Forest and Morgan Hill State Forest, and is managed by the New York State Department of Environmental Conservation. The area is open to the public and includes Labrador Pond and Tinker Falls.

Physical features
Labrador Hollow sits within a  glacially carved valley with steep walls. The valley's orientation and topography cause it to be shaded for most of the day, leading to cooler conditions and plant life more typical of mountain bogs such as those found in the Adirondacks.

Tinker Falls
The falls are formed by a small stream which cut a gorge through shale above a  layer of limestone, which rests atop more shale. As the limestone shelf eroded much slower than the more easily eroded shale below, a waterfall with a recessed amphitheater was formed.

Labrador Pond
The pond supports a variety of warm-water fish species, and contains significant aquatic vegetation. The pond's outflow is Labrador Creek, which flows into the east branch of the Tioughnioga River.

Recreation and facilities

Labrador Hollow Unique Area is open to the public for recreation including hiking, snowshoeing, cross-country skiing, nature viewing, fishing, hunting, and non-motorized boating. A hang glider launch is located on a hillside in the eastern portion of the area.

Additional accessible features include a fishing pier along the pond's western shore, and a trail to view Tinkers Falls from near its base. Trails to reach the recessed amphitheater behind the falls, as well as to reach the top of the falls, were improved in 2014. 

Sportfish species in Labrador Pond include chain pickerel, largemouth bass, pumpkinseed, bluegill, yellow perch, common carp, and brown bullhead. Fishing is permitted from a pier constructed on the western shore, or from non-motorized boats that may be hand-launched from the same location. To protect the sensitive shoreline habitat, shore fishing is not permitted.

Prohibited activities within the unique area include camping and the building of fires, although primitive camping is permitted in the adjacent state forest properties.

See also
 List of New York state forests

References

External links

 NYS Department of Environmental Conservation: Labrador Hollow Unique Area

Waterfalls of New York (state)
Protected areas of Cortland County, New York
Protected areas of Onondaga County, New York
New York (state) unique areas